The official anthem of Terengganu, Malaysia is "(God) Save The Sultan" (Jawi:). It was composed by Mohamad Hashim bin Abu Bakar in 1927, an Assistant Teacher at the Malay Primary School at Paya Bunga. He also wrote the lyrics.

History 
In 1927, Sultan Sulaiman Badrul Alam Shah instructed Mohamad Hashim bin Abu Bakar to compose a tune, which was to be played on the occasion of His Highness's birthday. Abu Bakar was then the leader of a Boy Scout band in Kuala Terengganu and later Bandmaster of the Terengganu Police Band. The music which he composed with accompanying words were submitted to the late Dato Sri Andika Di Raja, who was Aide-de-Camp to the Sultan and also a member of the Council of Ministers, and a few days later Abu Bakar was commanded to appear outside the Istana Kolam (Royal Palace), and he sang the anthem to the accompaniment of the Band of the Sultan Sulaiman Boy Scouts Troop in His Highness's presence. Not long afterwards Abu Bakar trained a group of school children from Paya Bunga to sing the anthem and after he sang it a second time the Sultan accepted the music and words as the Terengganu State Anthem and commanded that Abu Bakar should be rewarded.

Japanese Occupation 
A slight amendment was made to the fourth and sixth lines during the Japanese occupation but the music and the rest of the words remained as they were originally composed.

Lyrics

Notes

External links 
 State anthem at National-Anthems.org
 Anthem mp3

Terengganu
Anthems of Malaysia
1927 songs